"Macho Macho" is a song recorded in 1988 by Austrian singer Rainhard Fendrich. It was Fendrich's most successful song. It did not only reach the top of the Austrian charts, but also #2 in Germany and #3 in Switzerland. The song is 3 minutes and 12 seconds long.

References

1988 singles
Rainhard Fendrich songs
1988 songs